Benatti is an Italian surname. Notable people with the surname include:

Andrea Benatti (born 1979), Italian rugby union player
Oreste Benatti (born 1906), Italian footballer
Renato Netson Benatti (born 1981), Brazilian footballer

See also
Benetti (surname)

Italian-language surnames